Paşabahçe Spor Kulübü (English: Paşabahçe Sports Club) (more commonly known as Paşabahçe) was a professional basketball club that was based in Istanbul, Turkey.

History
Paşabahçe was founded in 1950 as a basketball section of the Şişecam A.Ş., an industrial group with the main activity fields of glass and chemicals production. At the end of the 1991-92 season Paşabahçe has withdrawn from the league due to financial reasons.

Honours
 Turkish League
 Runners-up (2): 1989–1990, 1991–1992
 Turkish Cup
 Winners (1): 1992

Notable players
  Efe Aydan (1987–1988)
  Kemal Dinçer 
  Orhun Ene (1989–1992)
  Harun Erdenay (1990–1992)

References

External links
 TBLStat.net Team Profile

Defunct basketball teams in Turkey
Basketball teams established in 1950
1950 establishments in Turkey
Sports clubs disestablished in 1992